Gorgonin is a complex protein that makes up the horny skeleton of the holaxonia suborder of gorgonians. It frequently contains appreciable quantities of bromine, iodine, and tyrosine.

Scientific use
Research has shown that measurements of the gorgonin and calcite within species of gorgonia can be useful in paleoclimatology  and paleoceanography. Studies of the growth, composition, and structure of the skeleton of certain gorgonia species, (e.g., Primnoa resedaeformis, and Plexaurella dichotoma) can be highly correlated with seasonal and climatic variation.

References

Proteins